General Peterson may refer to:

Chesley G. Peterson (1920–1990), U.S. Air Force major general
Erik C. Peterson (general) (fl. 1980s–2020s), U.S. Army lieutenant general
Virgil L. Peterson (1882–1956), U.S. Army major general

See also
General Petersen (disambiguation)
Attorney General Peterson (disambiguation)